Yekhe-Tsakir is a rural locality (a selo) in Zakamensky District, Republic of Buryatia, Russia. The population was 668 as of 2010. There are 5 streets.

Geography 
Yekhe-Tsakir is located 24 km southwest of Zakamensk (the district's administrative centre) by road. Tsakir is the nearest rural locality.

References 

Rural localities in Zakamensky District